Maktupur is a small village in North Gujarat, West India. It is in Mehsana district. Maktupur is between the three cities of Patan (26 km west), Visanagar (28 km south-east), and Mahesana (25 km south).

Geography
It has an average elevation of 110 metres (364 feet).

Notable persons from Maktupur
• Dr. Ramesh Patel (B.V.Sc & A.H; D.V.M.):  A first Veterinarian in the village. Graduated from Gujarat Veterinary college,   Anand in 1984–85. After serving three years in Banaskantha milk producers union Ltd ( Banas Dairy-Palanpur), join Government Of Gujarat, Animal Husbandry department as a Veterinarian from 1987 to 2000. After serving several years in Government Of Gujarat now working as a Veterinarian in the Federal Government of Canada at Calgary, Alberta since 2007.

References

Villages in Mehsana district